Esteban Gil Borges (Caracas, 1879 – Caracas, 3 August 1942), was a Venezuelan politician, diplomat, writer and university professor.

Biography
Esteban Gil Borges was born in 1879 in Caracas, Venezuela. He worked as a lawyer, diplomat, and politician. He was the 147th Minister of Foreign Affairs of Venezuela from 2 January 1919 until 7 July 1921.

Esteban Gil Borges was a member of the Venezuelan Academy of Language (1916) and a founding member of the Academy of Political Sciences (1915).

See also 
Colombia–Venezuela relations 
List of Ministers of Foreign Affairs of Venezuela

References 

 Biography of the Foreign Affairs Ministry
 Cardozo, Elsa (2005) “Esteban Gil Borges”. Caracas: El Nacional/Banco del Caribe.

External links
 “Biography at Venezuelatuya.com Dictionary of History of Venezuela”, Polar Foundation, 1997.

  

 

1879 births
1942 deaths
People from Caracas
Venezuelan diplomats
20th-century Venezuelan judges
Venezuelan Ministers of Foreign Affairs
Central University of Venezuela alumni
Academic staff of the Central University of Venezuela
Ambassadors of Venezuela to Spain
Members of the Venezuelan Academy of Language